Valencene is a sesquiterpene that is an aroma component of citrus fruit and citrus-derived odorants.  It is obtained inexpensively from Valencia oranges.  Valencene is biosynthesized from farnesyl pyrophosphate (FPP) by the CVS enzyme.

It is a precursor to nootkatone, the main contributor to the aroma and flavor of grapefruit and is often used in insecticides, cleaning, personal care products and cosmetics.

References

Sesquiterpenes
Decalins
Alkene derivatives
Cyclohexenes